Camp Lake may refer to:

Lakes
 Camp Lake (Alaska), a lake on Baranof Island in the Alaskan Panhandle
 Camp Lake (Antarctica)
 Camp Lake (California), a lake in Tuolumne County, California
 Camp Lake (Idaho), a glacial lake in Elmore County, Idaho
 Camp Lake (Oregon), an alpine lake in the Cascade Range
 Camp Lake (Swift County, Minnesota) a lake in Minnesota
 Lake Camp, a lake adjacent to Lake Clearwater in New Zealand
 Sugar Camp Lake, a lake in Oneida County, Wisconsin

Communities
 Camp Lake Township, Minnesota, a township in Swift County, Minnesota
 Camp Lake, Wisconsin, a census-designated place in Kenosha County, Wisconsin
 Camp A Lake, Minnesota, an unorganized territory in St. Louis County, Minnesota

Other
 Camp Lake National Wildlife Refuge, located in North Dakota